Fatal Truth is a book written by Robin Burcell and published by Avon Books (now owned by HarperCollins) on 30 July 2002, which later went on to win the Anthony Award for Best Paperback Original in 2003.

References 

Anthony Award-winning works
American mystery novels
2002 American novels
Avon (publisher) books